Lucy and Desi is a 2022 American documentary film directed by Amy Poehler in her documentary directorial debut. The film explores the unlikely partnership and enduring legacy of one of the most prolific power couples in entertainment history, Lucille Ball and Desi Arnaz.

The film had its worldwide release on March 4, 2022 through Amazon Prime Video. It received positive reviews and was nominated for six Emmy Awards including the Emmy Award for Outstanding Documentary or Nonfiction Special, winning two.

Synopsis 
Lucy and Desi is an insightful and intimate peek behind the curtain of the relationship between two remarkable trailblazers – featuring interviews with Lucie Arnaz Luckinbill, Norman Lear, Desi Arnaz Jr, Carol Burnett and Bette Midler.

Production 
The film is directed by Emmy Award winning actress, comedian and director Amy Poehler in her documentary directorial debut, and written by Mark Monroe. Poehler and the creative team were able to utilize never-before-heard audio interviews with Ball and Arnaz after producer Jeanne Elfant Festa discovered a box of audiotapes while exploring archival materials with Lucy and Desi's daughter, Lucie Arnaz Luckinbill. Furthermore, the production team had full access to the Ball/Arnaz estate overseen by Arnaz Luckinbill.

Release 
Lucy and Desi debuted at the Sundance Film Festival on January 22, 2022. The film was released worldwide on Amazon Prime Video on March 4, 2022.

Reception 
The review aggregator website Rotten Tomatoes surveyed 97 critics and assessed 91 as positive and 6 as negative for a 94% rating. The critics consensus reads "Equal parts entertaining and informative, Lucy and Desi takes a palpably affectionate look at the lives and legacies of its groundbreaking subjects." Among the reviews, Metacritic determined an average rating of 7.3/10.

Awards and nominations

External links

References 

2022 documentary films
I Love Lucy
Primetime Emmy Award-winning broadcasts